Bithynia transsilvanica is a species of freshwater snail, an aquatic prosobranch gastropod mollusk in the family Bithyniidae.

Taxonomy
It was sometimes considered to be an eastern subspecies of Bithynia leachii, and then it was known as Bithynia leachii troschelii.

Specific epithet troschelii of its synonym is in honor of German zoologist Franz Hermann Troschel.

Distribution 
 Czech Republic - It was thought to be locally extinct in Moravia and was considered as regionally extinct in the Czech Republic (RE). There were rediscovered populations in southern Moravia near Lednice and from Nesyt pond in 2008. It was also discovered in Bohemia as a non-indigenous.
 Slovakia
 Germany - Recorded in Berlin, Brandenburg, Hamburg, Mecklenburg-Vorpommern, Lower Saxony and Thuringia. It is considered as high endangered (Stark gefährdet) in Mecklenburg-Vorpommern and in Lower Saxony.
 Hungary

Description

Height of shell: 9–11 mm. Width of shell: 5–6 mm.

Habitat
Freshwater species.

References

External links 

 Falniowski A., Glöer P. & Szarowska M. (2004). "Bithynia troschelii (Paach, 1842), a giant of unknown origin?" Folia Malacologica 12(3): 137–139. PDF.

Bithyniidae
Gastropods described in 1853